The Burke Building in downtown Pittsburgh, Pennsylvania is a building from 1836. It was Pittsburgh's first major office building and a major anchor of the city's financial district centered on Fourth Avenue. Since the 1845 Great Fire burned over a thousand buildings, it is the city's only remaining large Greek Revival building. It was listed on the National Register of Historic Places in 1978.

References

External links

 The Burke Building page at Brookline Connection

Commercial buildings on the National Register of Historic Places in Pennsylvania
Commercial buildings in Pittsburgh
Commercial buildings completed in 1836
Greek Revival architecture in Pennsylvania
Pittsburgh History & Landmarks Foundation Historic Landmarks
National Register of Historic Places in Pittsburgh